Phintella kaptega is a species of jumping spider in the genus Phintella that lives in Kenya. The species is named after the area around the Kaptega river where it was first found. The spider was first described in 2016 by Angelika Dawidowicz and Wanda Wesołowska in 2016, and is distinguished by the large pockets in the female's epigyne. It is a small spider with a light brown carapace that has a dark line along its edge.

Taxonomy
Phintella kaptega was first identified in 2016 by Angelika Dawidowicz and Wanda Wesołowska. The species name is derived from the name of the area where it first found.  It is one of over 500 species identified by Wesołowska. The genus Phintella was raised in 1906 by Embrik Strand and W. Bösenberg. The genus name derives from the genus Phintia, which it resembles. The genus Phintia was itself renamed Phintodes, which was subsequently absorbed into Tylogonus. There are similarities between spiders within genus Phintella and those in Chira, Chrysilla, Euophrys, Icius, Jotus and Telamonia. Genetic analysis confirms that it is related to the genera Helvetia and Menemerus and is classified in the tribe Chrysillini.

Description
The spider was initially described by Angelika Dawidowicz and Wanda Wesołowska in 2016 based on the collection of the Swedish arachnologist Åke Holm. The species is similar to Phintella aequipes but differs in the copulatory organs. The spider has a very light brown carapace which has a dark line along its edges. The clypeus is similarly dark. The abdomen is generally oval in shape and yellow with a pattern of brown markings. The female is slightly smaller and lighter than the male. The male has small, light brown pedipalps and a short spiky embolus. The female has very large pockets that occupy almost half of the epigyne, which is distinctive for the species.

Distribution
Phintella kaptega was first identified from examples discovered on the slopes of Mount Elgon in Kenya near the Kaptega River.

References

Citations

Bibliography

Endemic fauna of Kenya
Spiders described in 2016
Salticidae
Spiders of Africa
Taxa named by Wanda Wesołowska